Doc DelCastillo is an American ice hockey coach. He has coached at varying levels of amateur and professional ice hockey as both an assistant and head coach, most recently for Hamline University.

Career statistics

Head coaching record

†Alaska was retroactively forced to forfeit all wins and ties due to player ineligibilities.

References

External links

1968 births
Alaska Nanooks men's ice hockey coaches
American ice hockey coaches
American men's ice hockey goaltenders
Ice hockey coaches from Minnesota
Living people
Sportspeople from Saint Paul, Minnesota
St. Cloud State Huskies men's ice hockey players
Ice hockey people from Saint Paul, Minnesota